Schizophonic is the fifth album by music producer Geoff Wilkinson's jazz/rap fusion project Us3. It features a more upbeat approach than most of the tracks from previous albums by Us3, and—as on the previous 2004 album Questions—no samples but live recordings were used in its production. Wilkinson's liking for Southern American rhythms, which had pushed the 2001 release An Ordinary Day in an Unusual Place into a new direction, can still be traced. The album features two new rappers, Akil Dasan and Gaston, both of whom Geoff found at New York City's Nuyorican Poets Café. While Akil's prominent features exhibit a quick and crisp delivery, Gaston has more of an old-school approach. The live band consists of Chris Storr (trumpet), Ed Jones (saxophone), Neville Malcolm (double bass), Ernie Cranenburgh (jazz guitar), pianists Mike Gorman, Sean Hargreaves and John Crawford, as well as turntablist DJ First Rate. Schizophonic was first released in 2006.

Track listing
"That's How We Do It" – 4:34 (G Wilkinson/A D Baker)
"Kick This" – 4:25 (G Wilkinson/A D Baker/G Thomas)
"Was It Love?" – 4:16 (G Wilkinson/A D Baker)
"Huff & Puff" – 4:03 (G Wilkinson/G Thomas)
"What's Going On in the World Today?" – 4:30 (G Wilkinson/A D Baker/G Thomas)
"Much 2 Much" – 4:47 (G Wilkinson/A D Baker)
"Girls U Like" – 4:10 (G Wilkinson/A D Baker/G Thomas)
"If Only" – 2:17 (G Wilkinson)
"Don't Even Ask" – 5:38 (G Wilkinson/G Thomas)
"Jobsworth" – 0:39 (G Wilkinson)
"Get Busy" –3:54 (G Wilkinson/A D Baker)
"K.I.S.S.Y.O.U." – 3:33 (G Wilkinson/A D Baker)
"1-2-3-4U" – 4:40 (G Wilkinson/A D Baker/G Thomas)
"Round the Globe" – 6:10 (G Wilkinson/G Thomas)

2006 albums
Us3 albums